Tea is a mid-19th century painting by French artist James Tissot. Done in oil on wood, the painting depicts a scene in which a young woman reacts to word that a captain is departing. Tea is itself a repetition of the left-hand side of a larger work by Tissot, Bad News. The work is in the collection of the Metropolitan Museum of Art.

References 

1872 paintings
Paintings in the collection of the Metropolitan Museum of Art